Wollert may refer to:

Wollert (surname)
Wollert (given name)
Wollert, Victoria